McNeese State University is a public university in Lake Charles, Louisiana. Founded in 1939 as Lake Charles Junior College, it was renamed McNeese Junior College after John McNeese, an early local educator. The present name was adopted in 1970. McNeese is part of the University of Louisiana System and is classified as a Master's University. The selective admissions university consists of six colleges and the Doré School of Graduate Studies. McNeese is accredited by the Southern Association of Colleges and Schools and all programs of study are accredited by their respective national boards.

History

McNeese State University was founded in 1939 as a division of Louisiana State University and was originally called Lake Charles Junior College. It offered only the first two years of higher education. McNeese opened its doors on an  tract donated by the Calcasieu Parish Police Jury, the parish governing board. There were two original buildings: the former Administration Building (Kaufman Hall) and the McNeese Arena (Ralph O. Ward Memorial Gym). The auditorium, now Francis G. Bulber Auditorium, was completed in 1940 as the third building on the campus. These three buildings are still in use today. The name became John McNeese Junior College in 1940 by resolution of the University Board of Supervisors in honor of Imperial Calcasieu Parish's first superintendent of schools.

In 1950, the college became an autonomous four-year institution as McNeese State College.  The bill was advanced by State Senator Gilbert Franklin Hennigan of DeRidder in neighboring Beauregard Parish. It was separated from Louisiana State University and renamed McNeese State College. Its administration was transferred to the Louisiana State Board of Education. In 1960, legislators authorized McNeese to offer curricula leading to the master's degree; in 1966, the degree of Educational Specialist was first offered. In 1970, its name changed to McNeese State University. McNeese was first accredited in 1954 by the Southern Association of Colleges and Schools.

Leadership

Dr. Joseph T. Farrar (1939–1940)
Dr. William B. Hatcher (1940–1941)
Dr. Rodney Cline (1941–1944)
Dr. Lether Edward Frazar (1944–1955) Retired in 1955, became lieutenant governor of Louisiana thereafter.
Dr. Wayne N. Cusic (1955–1969) Retired in 1969.
Dr. Thomas S. Leary (1969–1980) Resigned from presidency.
Dr. Jack Doland (1980–1987) Resigned in order to run for state office.
Dr. Robert Hébert (1987–2010)
Dr. Philip C. Williams (2010–2017)
Dr. Daryl Burckel (2017–Present)

Campus

The main campus occupies  lined with oak trees in the heart of south Lake Charles. The main campus includes 68 main buildings.

A renovation of the quadrangle was recently completed to relieve the flooding that plagued students during rainy days. The Southwest Louisiana Entrepreneurial and Economic Development (SEED) Center has also been recently completed, allowing local business leaders and McNeese students to work in tandem. The newly renovated Jack V. Doland Field House, which now houses offices for all of the football coaches, equipment manager, conditioning and strength coach and members of the athletic administration as well as the ticket office, held its official grand opening and ribbon cutting ceremony September 9, 2011. A commemorative statue of John McNeese has recently been placed near Smith Hall, and new decorative signs have been built on each corner of the main campus. Also, a recent $16 million annex to the Shearman Fine Arts Center has been completed and renovations have begun on the older sections of the facility.

The McNeese State Recreational Sports Complex includes two weight rooms, basketball courts, tennis courts, an indoor track, and an Olympic-size swimming pool.

Academics

McNeese State University offers 83 degree programs in its six colleges and the graduate school.

The College of Agricultural Sciences
The College of Business
The Burton College of Education
The College of Liberal Arts
The College of Nursing and Health Professions
The College of Science, Engineering, and Math
The Doré School of Graduate Studies

McNeese is the first university in the State of Louisiana to offer a concentration in forensic chemistry. It is one of the first schools in the nation to offer a concentration in terrorism, preparedness and security.

The College of Nursing and Health Professions is housed in the Juliet Hardtner Hall, named for a McNeese donor and daughter of the Louisiana timber magnate and conservationist, Henry E. Hardtner of La Salle Parish.

The Department of English and Foreign Languages, in conjunction with the local chapter of Sigma Tau Delta, publishes The Arena, which is an annual collection of art, essays, fiction, and poetry by students, regardless of major.

Fifteen members of faculty have received Fulbright Awards. Faculty members in the Departments of Engineering, Performing Arts, Social Sciences and English and Foreign Languages have taught in Rwanda, Romania, Greece, Korea, and Wales, among other countries. In the Department of English and Foreign Languages alone, four faculty members have received Fulbrights.

McNeese is the only institution in the state of Louisiana to have a Kodály Certification Program as part of its Music Education degree.

The College of Business is accredited by the Association to Advance Collegiate Schools of Business. Less than 5% of the world's business schools are accredited by this prestigious association.

The Engineering departments housed in the College of Science, Engineering, and Math offers a multi-discipline curriculum to all students with majors in chemical, civil, electrical, and mechanical engineering. That is, students in these individual disciplines are taught by faculty of other disciplines in certain classes. In addition to the degree of Bachelor of Science in engineering, the departments also offer the Master of Engineering degree in chemical, civil, electrical, and mechanical engineering and engineering management. The college is closely linked to the nearby petrochemical industries and refineries through the Industrial Advisory Board and Lake Area Industry Alliance/McNeese Engineering Partnership. Many students participate in internships with the related industries. The Engineering Program is ranked seventh nationally with the greatest lifetime return on investment (ROI)  by Payscale

McNeese recently formed an Institute for Industry-Education Collaboration that will offer training courses as well as continuing education courses for local Lake Area industries and graduates of McNeese.

Athletics

McNeese's colors are blue and gold. The men's sports teams are known as the Cowboys, while the women's athletic teams are the Cowgirls. McNeese State sports teams participate in NCAA Division I (Football Championship Subdivision for football) in the Southland Conference.

Football

The football team plays at Louis Bonnette Field at Cowboy Stadium, which seats 17,000 fans. It is also known as "The Hole" or lately as "the lil' House" and is located near campus.  The team played in the inaugural Independence Bowl game in 1976, a 20–16 victory over Tulsa.  They went on to make two more appearances in 1979 and 1980.  The Cowboys football team have more recently played in two Division I-AA Finals, in 1997 and 2002.

Basketball

The Cowboys basketball and volleyball teams both moved into the venue now known as The Legacy Center in 2018. This gave the basketball teams their first on-campus facility since leaving the Ralph O. Ward arena. In 1956 the Cowboys won the NAIA Division I Men's Tournament. It was the only appearance the Cowboys made in the NAIA tournament. McNeese State defeated Texas Southern 60 to 55. The men's basketball team has made two appearances in the NCAA men's basketball tournament, most recently in 2002, and the team has qualified for the NIT three times, the most recent invitation being in 2011. The school's most famous basketball alumnus is Joe Dumars, who was a first-round draft pick (18th overall) of the Detroit Pistons in 1985 and went on to have a Hall of Fame career with them.

The women's basketball team earned its invitation to the "Big Dance" in 2011, by sweeping the Southland Conference Tournament. In 2011, both the men's and women's basketball teams claimed the Southland Conference title in their respective divisions, marking the first time in the 25-year history of the Southland Conference that the men's and women's teams from the same university have won regular-season titles in the same year.

Baseball

The baseball team plays games at Cowboy Diamond.  The Cowboys' baseball teams have made several appearances in the NCAA Division I Baseball Championship, most recently in 2000, 2003, and 2019.

Soccer
The McNeese Cowgirls soccer team plays their games at Cowgirl Field. The soccer program began in 1996, and has since claimed 1 regular season Southland Conference Championship in 2007 and 1 Southland Conference Tournament Championships in 13 tournament appearances. In 2015, the Cowgirl Soccer Team named Drew Fitzgerald just the second Head Coach in program history, following Scooter Savoie who had been at the helm since the founding of the program in 1996. Fitzgerald, who had previously served as the team's Associate Head Coach, made an immediate impact in the program, leading the Cowgirls to a 9-10-1 record and taking the sixth place seed in their 13th Southland Conference Tournament appearance and their first appearance in the second round of the tournament since the 2008 season. The last and only time the Cowgirl Soccer team was able to capture the Southland Conference Tournament title and earn a bid to the NCAA Championship tournament was in 2006, when the team suffered a 2-0 first round loss to Southern Methodist University.

Student life

McNeese State University's speech and debate team is recognized as a national powerhouse and boasts numerous national championships over the last 40 years. The McNeese State University newspaper is The Contraband, a weekly publication which has existed since 1939. The university's award-winning student yearbook is The Log. It was first published in 1941.

Greek life
The Greek community of McNeese State University comprises 14 Greek letter organizations.

Notable people

Alumni
Fabulous Flournoy - current assistant coach with the Toronto Raptors, former player and head coach for basketball team Newcastle Eagles, who competed in the British Basketball League.
Joe W. Aguillard – President of Louisiana Christian University in Pineville, 2005-2014
 Danny Ardoin - former Major League Baseball catcher
 James Armes – Louisiana state representative for Beauregard and Vernon parishes since 2008; landscape contractor in Leesville
 Zack Bronson – former safety for the San Francisco 49ers, 1997–2003
 Ben Broussard – former Major League Baseball first baseman
 Tierre Brown – former National Basketball Association player and MVP of the NBA Development League in 2004
James D. Cain Jr. - Federal Judge for the United States District Court for the Western District of Louisiana
 Christopher Catrambone – businessman and humanitarian, founder of Migrant Offshore Aid Station
 Michael Ray Charles – contemporary artist
 Clay Condrey – former Major League Baseball pitcher; played for the San Diego Padres and the Philadelphia Phillies
Mike Danahay (B.B.A. c. 1979), Louisiana state representative for Calcasieu Parish since 2008; sales representative in Lake Charles
 Joe Dumars – former National Basketball Association guard for the Detroit Pistons and MVP of the 1989 NBA Finals; member of the Basketball Hall of Fame
 Dan Flavin – Lake Charles Realtor and former state representative
 Ray Fontenot – former Major League Baseball pitcher, 1983–1986; pitched for the New York Yankees, Chicago Cubs, and Minnesota Twins
Douglas B. Fournet, United States Army officer and posthumous recipient of the Medal of Honor during the Vietnam War.
 Keith Frank – Zydeco musician
 Brett Geymann – state representative from District 35, Calcasieu Parish
 Dorothy Sue Hill (Home Economics Education, 1960) – state representative for Allen, Beauregard, and Calcasieu parishes since 2008, rancher in Dry Creek 
 Bob Howry – Major League Baseball pitcher for the Chicago Cubs
Adam Johnson – novelist and winner of 2012 Pulitzer Prize
 Kerry Joseph – retired quarterback of the Saskatchewan Roughriders of the CFL.
 Doug Kershaw – Cajun musician, obtained degree in mathematics
 Bobby Kimball - American singer and songwriter best known as the original and longtime frontman of the rock band Toto (band) from 1977 to 1984 and again from 1998 to 2008
 Chuck Kleckley – state representative from southwestern Calcasieu Parish; Speaker of the Louisiana House of Representatives since 2012
 Luke Lawton – NFL fullback/half back for Indianapolis Colts, Philadelphia Eagles, and the Oakland Raiders.
Conway LeBleu – attended as junior college student; Lake Charles native; represented Calcasieu and Cameron parishes in the Louisiana House, 1964-1988
Demond Mallet – former German Bundesliga basketball allstar (2002, 2004, 2005, 2007) and Championship MVP (2004–5 season); the highest paid professional basketball player in Belgium
 Dan Morrish – member of both houses of the Louisiana State Legislature from Jennings
 Keith Ortego – former American football wide receiver for the Chicago Bears of the NFL; member of the Bears team that won Super Bowl XX following the 1985 NFL season
 Eric Pete – New York Times bestselling author
 Kavika Pittman – former defensive end and second-round draft pick of the Dallas Cowboys in the 1996 NFL Draft
 Rupert Richardson – African-American civil rights activist and civil rights leader who served as president of the National Association for the Advancement of Colored People (NAACP) from 1992 to 1995.
 Dan Richey – former state representative and state senator and Republican political activist
 B. J. Sams – punt and kick-off returner for the Baltimore Ravens, and the Kansas City Chiefs
 Tom Sestak – defensive tackle for the Buffalo Bills; in January 1970, Sestak was selected as a member of the All-Time All-AFL Team, and in 2009 as a member of the Bills' 50th Anniversary Team.
 Leonard Smith – former first round draft pick, 17th overall, of the St. Louis Cardinals (NFL) in the 1983 NFL Draft; played cornerback and safety in the NFL for the Cardinals, 1983–1988 and the Buffalo Bills, 1988–1991
 R. C. Slocum – head football coach at Texas A&M University, 1989–2002; the coach with the most wins in Texas A&M football history
 Vic Stelly – former state representative for Calcasieu Parish and author of the Stelly Plan who also did postgraduate studies at McNeese and served as a college administrator
 Dennis Stine – state representative (1987-1988), state commissioner of administration (1988 to 1992), timber businessman; resident of Lake Charles 
 Tim Stine – state representative (1988-1996), city council member for his native Sulphur, Louisiana; timber businessman 
Joe Gray Taylor – distinguished historian of Louisiana and the American South; chairman of the McNeese history department; later the dean of the College of Liberal
John Thomson – former MLB player (Colorado Rockies, New York Mets, Texas Rangers, Atlanta Braves, Kansas City Royals)
Donald Vidrine, BP supervisor on the ill-fated Deepwater Horizon oil rig that exploded in the Gulf of Mexico in 2010

Faculty
 Ray Authement – Professor of Mathematics; the fifth president of the University of Louisiana at Lafayette, 1974–2008; the longest serving president of a public university in the United States
 Edith Killgore Kirkpatrick – music professor at McNeese, 1955–1958; later member of Louisiana Board of Regents
 Joe Gray Taylor – historian of the South and Louisiana

References

External links

 
 McNeese State Athletics website

 
Acadiana
Lake Charles, Louisiana
Universities and colleges accredited by the Southern Association of Colleges and Schools
Education in Calcasieu Parish, Louisiana
Buildings and structures in Lake Charles, Louisiana
Tourist attractions in Calcasieu Parish, Louisiana
Educational institutions established in 1939
1939 establishments in Louisiana
Public universities and colleges in Louisiana